FPY may refer to:
 Compagnie Africaine d'Aviation, an airline of the Democratic Republic of the Congo
 Play, a low-cost airline of Iceland
 First pass yield
 Perry–Foley Airport, in Florida, United States
 PFA Fans' Player of the Year